The Norwegian Hospital and Health Service Association is an interest organisation in Norway.

It was founded as the Norwegian Hospital Association in 1937. It is a member body of the International Hospital Federation and the European Association of Hospital Managers. It organizes health trusts, health service bodies of municipalities, private hospitals, health education institutions, patient organizations, health utility suppliers and interested people.

Chairman of the board is Erik K. Normann, secretary-general is May Britt Buhaug and the organizational headquarters are in Nedre Slottsgate in Oslo.

References

External links
Official site

Medical and health organisations based in Norway
Organizations established in 1937
Organisations based in Oslo
1937 establishments in Norway